Charles Boyle, 4th Earl of Orrery KT PC FRS (28 July 1674 – 28 August 1731) was an English nobleman, statesman and patron of the sciences.

Early life
The second son of Roger Boyle, 2nd Earl of Orrery, and his wife Lady Mary Sackville (1647–1710), daughter of Richard Sackville, 5th Earl of Dorset, he was born at Little Chelsea, London. He was educated at Christ Church, Oxford, and soon distinguished himself by his learning and abilities.

Career
Like the first earl, he was an author, soldier and statesman. He translated Plutarch's life of Lysander, and published an edition of the epistles of Phalaris, which engaged him in the famous controversy with Bentley. He was a member of the Irish Parliament and sat for Charleville between 1695 and 1699. He was three times member for the town of Huntingdon; and on the death of his brother, Lionel, 3rd earl, in 1703, he succeeded to the title.

In 1706, he married Lady Elizabeth Cecil, daughter of John Cecil, 5th Earl of Exeter and Lady Anne Cavendish, at Burghley House. Their son and heir, John, was born the following year.

He entered the army, and in 1709 was raised to the rank of major-general, and sworn one of Her Majesty's Privy Council. He was appointed to the Order of the Thistle and appointed queen's envoy to the states of Brabant and Flanders; and having discharged this trust with ability, he was created an English peer, as Baron Boyle of Marston, in Somerset. He inherited the estate in 1714.

Boyle became a Fellow of the Royal Society in 1706. In 1713, under the patronage of Boyle, clockmaker George Graham created the first mechanical solar system model that could demonstrate proportional motion of the planets around the Sun. The device was named the orrery in the Earl's honour.

Charles Boyle received several additional honours in the reign of George I; but having had the misfortune to fall under the suspicion of the government for playing a part in the Jacobite Atterbury Plot, he was committed to the Tower in 1722, where he remained six months, and was then admitted to bail. On a subsequent inquiry, he was discharged.

Boyle wrote a comedy, As You Find It, printed in 1703 and later published together with the plays of the first earl.

In 1728, he was listed as one of the subscribers to the Cyclopaedia of Ephraim Chambers.

Later life
Boyle died at his house in Westminster in 1731 and was buried in Westminster Abbey. He bequeathed his personal library and collection of scientific instruments to Christ Church Library; the instruments are now on display in the Museum of the History of Science, Oxford.

His son John, the 5th Earl of Orrery, succeeded to the earldom of Cork on the failure of the elder branch of the Boyle family, as earl of Cork and Orrery.

References

Bibliography
Smith, Lawrence Berkley. Charles Boyle, 4th Earl of Orrery, 1674–1731 PhD dissertation, University of Edinburgh, 1994.

External links
 Portrait at the National Portrait Gallery, London

1674 births
1731 deaths
Alumni of Christ Church, Oxford
British Army generals
Burials at Westminster Abbey
Fellows of the Royal Society
Boyle, Charles
Knights of the Thistle
Lord-Lieutenants of Somerset
Members of the Parliament of Ireland (pre-1801) for County Cork constituencies
Members of the Privy Council of Great Britain
People from Chelsea, London
Charles
Ambassadors of Great Britain to the Netherlands
English MPs 1701
English MPs 1701–1702
English MPs 1702–1705
Members of the Parliament of England (pre-1707) for constituencies in Huntingdonshire
4th
1st